Vukica Mitić (Serbian Cyrillic: Вукица Митић, 7 December 1953 – 27 June 2019) was a Serbian basketball player. She represented the Yugoslavia national team internationally.

Career achievements and awards 
 FIBA Women's European Champions Cup winner: 1 (with Crvena zvezda: 1978–79).
 Yugoslav League champion: 7 (with Crvena zvezda: 1972–73, 1975–76, 1976–77, 1977–78, 1978–79, 1979–80, 1980–81) 
 Yugoslav Cup winner: 5 (with Crvena zvezda: 1972–73, 1973–74, 1975–76, 1978–79, 1980–81) 
 No. 8 honored by Crvena zvezda

References

1953 births
2019 deaths
Basketball players from Belgrade
Serbian women's basketball players
Olympic basketball players of Yugoslavia
Basketball players at the 1980 Summer Olympics
Olympic bronze medalists for Yugoslavia
Olympic medalists in basketball
ŽKK Crvena zvezda players
Yugoslav women's basketball players
Point guards
Medalists at the 1980 Summer Olympics